"Deutschösterreich, du herrliches Land" (German for "German Austria, you wonderful country") was the national anthem of Austria from 1920 to 1929. Although it was used as the national anthem, it did not enjoy any official status. It is now used as the anthem of the President of Austria and the Austrian Armed Forces due to its references to defend the Austrian homeland.

The text was written by Chancellor Karl Renner in 1920, while the melody was composed by Wilhelm Kienzl.

The Republic of German-Austria was formed in 1918 as the successor to the multinational Austro-Hungarian Empire in its predominantly German speaking part. The government and population was much in favour of a unification with Germany, the German nation-state that had been formed in 1871 but had excluded Austria. However, the victors of World War I demanded that Austria remained a separate country. In the Treaty of Versailles, there was a prohibition of unification. Under the provisions of the Treaty of Saint-Germain-en-Laye (1919), German Austria had to change its name to simply Austria.

See also 
 Sei gesegnet ohne Ende
 Deutschlandlied

Austrian music
Historical national anthems
National symbols of Austria
Republic of German-Austria
European anthems
German patriotic songs
German military marches
Austrian military marches
National anthem compositions in F major